The Ilagan River is a river in the province of Isabela, Cagayan Valley, Philippines. It is one of the major tributaries of the Cagayan River, the largest river in the Philippines. The Ilagan River originates from the western slopes of the Sierra Madre and drains the eastern central portion of the Cagayan River basin. It flows westward and joins the Cagayan River at Ilagan City, Isabela.

Tributaries

The major tributaries of Ilagan River are:
 Abuan River – originates from the mountains in the Northern Sierra Madre National Park where one of the widest tropical rainforests in the Luzon can be found. 
 Bintacan River

References

Rivers of the Philippines
Landforms of Isabela (province)
Ilagan